Safarovo (Safar) is a rural locality (a village) in Yenebey-Ursayevsky Selsoviet, Miyakinsky District, Bashkortostan, Russia. The population was 288 as of 2010. There are 5 streets.

Geography 
Safarovo is located 36 km southwest of Kirgiz-Miyaki (the district's administrative centre) by road. Tuksanbayevo is the nearest rural locality.

References 

Rural localities in Miyakinsky District